The Action Committee of the Cabinda National Union  (CAUNC) is a defunct, separatist organization that campaigned for the independence of Cabinda province from Portugal. CAUNC merged with the Movement for the Liberation of the Enclave of Cabinda (MLEC) and the Mayombe National Alliance in 1963 to form the Front for the Liberation of the Enclave of Cabinda (FLEC). Cabinda is now a province and an exclave of Angola.

See also
1960s in Angola
Angolan War of Independence

References

Rebel groups in Angola
National liberation movements in Africa
Cabinda independence movement